The Ombudsman's Office of Bolivia (Spanish: Defensoría del Pueblo) is an independent governmental institution established by the Constitution, charged with overseeing the fulfillment, protection, and promotion of human rights in the country. The Ombudsman's Office is functionally, financially, and administratively independent of the four branches of Bolivian government. It was established on 22 December 1997 by Law N° 1818, and is currently regulated by Law N° 870 of 13 December 2016. Governance scholar Tom Pegram writes that "the Bolivian Ombudsman's Office has been recognized as arguably the most effective state actor in terms of advancing rights and active citizenship".

List of Ombudsmen 
The Ombudsman or Defender of the People is the senior officer within the Ombudsman's Office, a post currently held by Pedro Callisaya.

References 

1997 establishments in Bolivia
Government agencies established in 1997
Government agencies of Bolivia
Human rights in Bolivia
National human rights institutions
 
Bolivia Defensoría